The Soul at Work: From Alienation to Autonomy is a book by the Italian philosopher Franco Berardi.

Summary 
In the book Berardi reflects on the new forms of alienation and addresses people's feelings of alienation in regards to work, as well as to how their refusal to submit to work used to be the foundation of a human community- that fought for autonomy against the work society.

Berardi cites a number of authors in the book. For example: Epicurus, Felix Guattari, Jean Baudrillard, Luciano Gallina, Gregory Bateso, Alain Ehrenberg, Giovanni Pico della Mirandola.

See also 
 Critique of work
 Pharmaceutical industry
 Socialisation

Sources

External links 
 The Soul at Work: From Alienation to Autonomy

Literature critical of work and the work ethic